Raúl Pérez Varela (born 16 August 1925, died before 2016) was an Argentine former basketball player who competed in the 1952 Summer Olympics.

References

1925 births
Year of death missing
Argentine men's basketball players
Olympic basketball players of Argentina
Basketball players at the 1951 Pan American Games
Basketball players at the 1952 Summer Olympics
Pan American Games silver medalists for Argentina
Pan American Games medalists in basketball
FIBA World Championship-winning players
Medalists at the 1951 Pan American Games